Ralph Callachan (born 29 April 1955 in Edinburgh) is a Scottish former footballer, who played for three senior clubs in Edinburgh; Hearts, Hibs and Meadowbank Thistle. He played in Scottish Cup finals for both Hearts and Hibs, but both were lost to Rangers. Hearts lost 3–1 in 1976 and Hibs lost 3–2 in the second replay of 1979.

Callachan started his career with Hearts, where he made enough of an impact to earn a £90,000 move to Newcastle United. He only played nine league games in England before returning to Edinburgh, this time with Hibernian. Hibs' popular full-back John Brownlie was sent to Newcastle as part of the deal to bring Callachan to Easter Road.

He also served as Berwick Rangers manager for two years, acting as a player/manager.

References

External links 
 

1955 births
Berwick Rangers F.C. managers
Berwick Rangers F.C. players
Greenock Morton F.C. players
Heart of Midlothian F.C. players
Hibernian F.C. players
Living people
Livingston F.C. players
Newcastle United F.C. players
Footballers from Edinburgh
Scottish Football League players
Scottish football managers
Scottish footballers
English Football League players
Scottish Football League managers
Association football midfielders